Owners, executives, and managers of Major League Baseball's Detroit Tigers.  Current personnel are indicated in bold.

Team owners

Presidents

General Managers

See also

 
 
Detroit Tigers
Owners and executives